The 1972–73 WHL season was the 21st season of the Western Hockey League. The Phoenix Roadrunners were the President's Cup champions as they beat the Salt Lake Golden Eagles in four games in the final series.

Final Standings 

bold - qualified for playoffs

Playoffs 

The Phoenix Roadrunners win the President's Cup 4 games to 0.

Awards

References 

Western Hockey League (1952–1974) seasons
1972–73 in American ice hockey by league